WLDV (107.9 FM) is a radio station broadcasting a Mainstream Urban format. Licensed to Frederiksted, U.S. Virgin Islands, the station is currently owned by Creative Minds, LLC.

External links

LDV
Radio stations established in 2012
2012 establishments in the United States Virgin Islands
Mainstream urban radio stations in the United States
Saint Croix, U.S. Virgin Islands